Port Washington is the name of some places in the United States of America:
Port Washington, New York
Port Washington, Ohio
Port Washington, Wisconsin, a city
Port Washington (town), Wisconsin, a town
Dyes Inlet, Washington, an inlet, formerly named Port Washington